David A. Permut (born March 23, 1954) is an American film producer. He has worked on dozens of films over 40 years, and has received both Academy and Emmy Award nominations.

Early life and education
Permut was born in New York City, New York to a Jewish family, the son of entrepreneur Lee Permut. His father moved the family from Manhattan to Los Angeles while he was a teen. While a youth, he sold maps to the Hollywood homes of the stars and later mixed with them at the Palm Springs Racquet Club and the Tennis Club, after his father purchased a second home in Palm Springs in the 1970s. He was introduced to producer Bill Sargent through his father who employed Permut, tasking him with soliciting agents to secure casting for a stage play he wanted to film; the project never came to fruition. Permut then went to work as a gofer for Roger Corman while he was taking classes at UCLA and later accepted a job at an independent talent agency in Beverly Hills.

Career

Feature films

Early in his career, Permut produced the 1975 film Give 'em Hell, Harry! He went on to produce the 1987 films Dragnet and Blind Date. In 1986, he then signed a production agreement with United Artists, where he is planning on to produce films like an adaptation of the 1950s TV show Highway Patrol, but it never came to fruition. He later produced the John Woo film Face/Off. He has produced a number of other films, including 1991's The Marrying Man and 29th Street, 1992's Captain Ron and Consenting Adults, 1993's The Temp, 1994's Surviving the Game, and others. 29th Street (1991) released by Twentieth Century Fox, Permut worked with  Bob Saget on the March of the Penguins parody film Farce of the Penguins in 2007. He produced the 2016 film Hacksaw Ridge, which was premiered at the Venice Film Festival. It was met with quality reception.
 
In addition to studio films, Permut has produced a number of independent films including Charlie Bartlett, Youth in Revolt, Struck by Lightning, and Match.

David was the co-producer alongside Ben Stiller of the 2009 documentary The Boys: The Sherman Brothers' Story, and later The Fabulous Allan Carr. He is slated to produce the film Chippendales, based on the all-women's nightclub of the same name. He is already producing a documentary about Chippendales.

Television

His television credits include 1984's Love Leads the Way, 1991's A Triumph of the Heart: The Ricky Bell Story, 1992's Breaking the Silence, 2009's series Prayers for Bobby, and 2014's The Color of Rain.

Theatre

He has done theatre production, including the stage production of The Investigation: A Search for the Truth in Ten Acts. He is slated to produce the Broadway theatre stage production Behind the Candelabra.

Personal life
, Permut has lived in Westwood, California. He has a second home in Palm Springs with his partner, John Seiber.

Filmography
He was a producer in all films unless otherwise noted.

Film

Camera and electrical department

Miscellaneous crew

Television

References

External links
 

1954 births
Film producers from California
20th-century American Jews
Television producers from California
Businesspeople from Palm Springs, California
Living people
21st-century American Jews